Hsieh Su-wei and Barbora Strýcová were the defending champions, but Strýcová retired from professional tennis in May 2021. Hsieh played alongside Elise Mertens, but lost in the second round to Sharon Fichman and Giuliana Olmos.

The alternates Fichman and Olmos went on to win the title, defeating Kristina Mladenovic and Markéta Vondroušová in the final, 4–6, 7–5, [10–5], saving 2 championship points, in the process. By reaching the final, Mladenovic usurped newly crowned Mertens for the doubles number 1 ranking.

Seeds

Draw

Finals

Top half

Bottom half

WTA doubles main draw entrants

Seeds

Rankings are as of April 26, 2021.

Other entrants
The following pairs received wildcards into the doubles main draw:
  Irina-Camelia Begu /  Sara Errani
  Nuria Brancaccio /  Lucia Bronzetti
  Giulia Gatto-Monticone /  Bianca Turati

The following pairs received entry into the doubles main draw using protected rankings:
  Alla Kudryavtseva /  Monica Niculescu
  Makoto Ninomiya /  Yaroslava Shvedova
  Elena Vesnina /  Vera Zvonareva

The following pairs received entry into the doubles main draw as alternates:
  Sharon Fichman /  Giuliana Olmos
  Wang Qiang /  Wang Yafan

Withdrawals
Before the tournament
  Tímea Babos /  Veronika Kudermetova → replaced by  Coco Gauff /  Veronika Kudermetova
  Ashleigh Barty /  Jennifer Brady → replaced by  Sharon Fichman /  Giuliana Olmos
  Sofia Kenin /  Alison Riske → replaced by  Wang Qiang /  Wang Yafan

References

External Links
Main Draw

2021 WTA Tour
Women's Doubles